Xyrosaris is a genus of moths of the family Yponomeutidae.

This genus is allied to Zelleria but distinct by the long antennae, peculiar palpi and scale-tufts of forewings.

Species
Xyrosaris acroxutha - Turner, 1923  (from Australia)
Xyrosaris campsiptila - Meyrick,  (from Sri Lanka)
Xyrosaris celastrella - Kearfott, 1903 
Xyrosaris dryopa - Meyrick, 1907  (from Australia)
Xyrosaris lichneuta - Meyrick, 1918  (China, Japan, Korea, Russia)
Xyrosaris lirinopa - Meyrick, 1922  (from China)
Xyrosaris maligna - Meyrick, 1907  (from India/Sri Lanka)
Xyrosaris melanopsamma - Meyrick, 1931  (from Japan)
Xyrosaris mnesicentra - Meyrick, 1913  (from British Guyana)
Xyrosaris obtorta - Meyrick, 1924 
Xyrosaris ochroplagiata - Braun, 1918  (from N.America)
Xyrosaris secreta - Meyrick, 1912  (from South Africa)

References

Yponomeutidae